The Gabriella Miller Kids First Research Act is a law that ended taxpayer contributions to the Presidential Election Campaign Fund and authorized a pediatric research initiative through the National Institutes of Health. The total funding for research would come to $126 million over 10 years. At the time of its passage, national conventions drew about 23% of their funding from the Presidential Election Campaign Fund.

It became law during the 113th United States Congress.

Background
Gabriella Miller of Leesburg, Virginia was a girl who died of diffuse intrinsic pontine glioma, a rare form of brain cancer on October 26, 2013 at the age of 10. While she was ill, she worked as an activist to raise support for research into childhood illnesses like cancer. Through her activism, she "raised hundreds of thousands of dollars for the Make-A-Wish Foundation and helped launch the Smashing Walnuts Foundation to fund pediatric cancer research." In "The Truth 365" documentary, Miller answered a question that what she'd like to tell American leaders about research on pediatric cancer was that there needed to be "less talking, more doing... We need action." House Majority Leader Eric Cantor saw this video and decided to name the bill in her honor.

Provisions of the bill
This summary is based largely on the summary provided by the Congressional Research Service, a public domain source.

The Gabriella Miller Kids First Research Act would amend the Internal Revenue Code to terminate the entitlement of any major or minor political party to a payment from the Presidential Election Campaign Fund for a presidential nominating convention. The bill transfers funds in each account maintained for the national committee of a party to a 10-Year Pediatric Research Initiative Fund, making them available only for allocation to national research institutes and national centers through the Common Fund for making grants for pediatric research under this Act.

The bill would amend the Public Health Service Act to require the Director of the National Institutes of Health (NIH), through the Division of Program Coordination, Planning, and Strategic Initiatives, to allocate funds appropriated under this Act to the national research institutes and national centers for making grants for pediatric research representing important areas of emerging scientific opportunities, rising public health challenges, or knowledge gaps that deserve special emphasis and would benefit from conducting or supporting additional research that involves collaboration between two or more national research institutes or national centers, or would otherwise benefit from strategic coordination and planning.

The bill would authorize $12.6 million out of the 10-Year Pediatric Research Initiative Fund for each of FY2014-FY2023 for pediatric research through the Common Fund. Requires such funds to supplement, not supplant, funds otherwise allocated by NIH for pediatric research. Prohibits the use of such amounts for any purpose other than allocating funds for making grants for pediatric research described in this Act.

Congressional Budget Office report
This summary is based largely on the summary provided by the Congressional Budget Office, a public domain source.

H.R. 2019 would amend federal law to end the taxpayers' option to designate a portion of their federal income tax balance to the Presidential Election Campaign Fund and end the authority to spend funds on Presidential campaigns or conventions. The bill also would authorize the appropriation of $13 million a year over the 2014-2023 period for pediatric research.

Procedural history
The Gabriella Miller Kids First Research Act was introduced into the United States House of Representatives on May 16, 2013 by Rep. Gregg Harper (R, MS-3). It was referred to the United States House Committee on Energy and Commerce, the United States House Committee on House Administration, the United States House Committee on Ways and Means, and the United States House Energy Subcommittee on Health. On December 11, 2013, the House voted in Roll Call Vote 632 to pass the bill 295-103. On March 11, 2014, the United States Senate passed the bill by unanimous consent.

Debate and discussion
According to Rep. Eric Cantor, the bill "clearly reflects Congressional priorities in funding: medical research before political parties and conventions."

102 House Democrats voted against the bill. The opposition, as stated in a Dear Colleague Letter, noted that the legislation had  "completely bypassed the committee process," and therefore lacked the benefit of "discussion and debate as to what would be the most effective way of increasing financial support for pediatric biomedical research."  Additional problems included the fact that the legislation "does not actually provide any additional funds to NIH. Rather, it specifies that the funds shall be available for NIH pediatric research "only to the extent and in such
amounts as are provided in advance in appropriation Acts."  The opposition also suggested that "perhaps this purely symbolic legislation is an effort to distract attention from the House Majority's actual record of support for biomedical research --a record which has been dismal in recent years." Rep. Frank Pallone Jr. (D-NJ) said that the bill was "a disingenuous and empty attempt by the Republicans to divert attention from the fact that they have voted to cut research time and time again."

Senator Minority Leader Mitch McConnell (R-KY) noted that "it's hard to imagine that there would be any objection to moving these funds to something we can all agree is a high priority - pediatric research."

The bill was opposed by some campaign finance reform groups who were skeptical that the money would actually be appropriated to the NIH.

See also
List of bills in the 113th United States Congress
Presidential election campaign fund checkoff
United States presidential nominating convention

Notes/References

External links

Library of Congress - Thomas H.R. 2019
beta.congress.gov H.R. 2019
GovTrack.us H.R. 2019
OpenCongress.org H.R. 2019
WashingtonWatch.com H.R. 2019
House Republican Conference's legislative digest on H.R. 2019
Congressional Budget Office's report on H.R. 2019

United States federal health legislation
United States federal election legislation
Acts of the 113th United States Congress
United States presidential nominating conventions